The Tangya Tusi Fortress is located in Tangya Town, Xianfeng County, Hubei Province, China. It is one of the three Tusi Sites designated by the UNESCO as a World Heritage Site, On July 3, 2015. As the capital, the site was built in 1355 (late Yuan dynasty) and abandoned in 1755 (Qing dynasty).

References 

Xianfeng County
Major National Historical and Cultural Sites in Hubei
Forts in China